The Aragón is a river in northern Spain, one of the left-hand tributaries of the river Ebro. It rises at Astún (province of Huesca) in the central Pyrenees Mountains, passes southwest through Jaca and Sangüesa (Navarre), and joins the Ebro at Milagro (Navarre), near Tudela. The name Aragón is related to the birth area of the former kingdom, which corresponds to the modern autonomous community of Aragón in Spain.

Watershed

Ecology
Non-government sanctioned re-introduction of Eurasian beaver (Castor fiber) in Spain around 2003 has resulted in tell-tale beaver signs documented on a  stretch on the lower course of the Aragón River and the area adjoining the Ebro River in Aragon, Spain.

References

See also 
 List of rivers of Spain

Rivers of Spain
Ebro basin
Rivers of Aragon
Rivers of Navarre